The 1st constituency of Békés County is one of the single member constituencies of the National Assembly, the national legislature of Hungary. The constituency standard abbreviation: Békés 01. OEVK.

Since 2018, it has been represented by Tamás Herczeg of the Fidesz–KDNP party alliance.

Geography
The 1st constituency is located in central part of Békés County.

List of municipalities
The constituency includes the following municipalities:

History
The 1st constituency of Békés County was created in 2011 and contained of the pre-2011 abolished constituencies of 1st and part of 2nd and 3rd constituency of this County. Its borders have not changed since its creation.

Members
The constituency was first represented by Gyula Vantara of the Fidesz from 2014 to 2018. Tamás Herczeg of the Fidesz was elected in 2018 and he was re-elected in 2022.

References

Békés 1st